Kaia is an Estonian and Norwegian name. It is also used as a variant for the name Kai, which means 'sea' in Hawaiian. Notable people with the name include:

Surname 
 Innocent Kaia (born 1992), Zimbabwean cricketer
 Mircan Kaia, Turkish musician and engineer
 Roy Kaia (born 1991), Zimbabwean cricketer
 Za Kaia (1926–1949), Burmese soldier

Given name 

 Kaia Gerber (born 2001), American model
 Kaia Iva (born 1964), Estonian politician
 Kaia Kanepi (born 1985), Estonian tennis player
 Kaia Arua (born 1990), Papua New Guinean cricketer
 Kaia Kater (born 1993), Canadian musician
 Kaia Wøien Nicolaisen (born 1990), Norwegian biathlete
 Kaia Bruland Nilssen (1868–1950), Norwegian novelist
 Kaia Parnaby (born 1990), Australian softball player
 Kaia Storvik (born 1976), Norwegian journalist and politician
 Kaia Urb (born 1956), Estonian singer 
 Kaia Wilson (born 1974), American punk rock singer and guitarist

See also

Kaja (name)

Estonian feminine given names
Norwegian feminine given names